Qusheh Bolagh (also Romanized as Qūsheh Bolāgh) is a village in Quri Chay-ye Gharbi Rural District, Saraju District, Maragheh County, East Azerbaijan Province, Iran. At the 2006 census, its population was 27, in 4 families.

References 

Towns and villages in Maragheh County